Michele Cruciani (born 4 May 1986) is an Italian football player who currently plays for Scandicci as a midfielder.

External links
 
 Michele Cruciani at TuttoCampo

1986 births
Footballers from Rome
Living people
Italian footballers
Association football midfielders
S.S. Virtus Lanciano 1924 players
S.S.D. Città di Gela players
PFC Chernomorets Burgas players
Matera Calcio players
Casertana F.C. players
Benevento Calcio players
S.S. Teramo Calcio players
U.S. Viterbese 1908 players
A.C.N. Siena 1904 players
U.S. Massese 1919 players
S.S.D. Lucchese 1905 players
Scandicci Calcio players
Serie C players
Serie D players
First Professional Football League (Bulgaria) players
Italian expatriate footballers
Expatriate footballers in Bulgaria